Park Geon-il (born November 5, 1987) is a South Korean actor, singer and model. He is the lead vocalist of Supernova. He is known for his lead roles in Koisuru Maison: Rainbow Rose, One Fine Week and Lonely Enough To Love.

Career
Park signed a contract with Marro Entertainment in 2000. He made his debut as an actor in 2002 in television series Honest Living. In 2003 he played a student role in television series Sang Doo! Let's Go to School and the next year he appeared in the television series  Love is All Around which gained him some attention. In 2007, he joined the boy group Supernova as its lead vocalist.

He then appeared in a number of films and dramas, including Soul as Jung Shi-woo, The King of Legend and Jang Bo-ri Is Here!. He also had a main role in drama Koisuru Maison: Rainbow Rose which was praised and gained attention him attention. In 2018, he left Marro Entertainment and signed a contract with Huayi Brothers Korea.

In 2019, Park starred in his eight acting appearance as Yoo Ji-han in the television series One Fine Week which made him noted by the audience.

In 2020 he got his first major acting role as the second male lead in the MBC television series Lonely Enough To Love as Kang Hyun-jin starring opposite of Kim So-eun and Ji Hyun-woo.

Discography

Filmography

Television

Web series

Film

Awards and nominations

References

External links
 
 

1987 births
Living people
People from Seoul
Male actors from Seoul
Models from Seoul
Singers from Seoul
21st-century South Korean male actors
South Korean male models
South Korean male television actors
South Korean male film actors
South Korean male idols
South Korean male singers
South Korean pop singers